= Pietro D'Ayala Valva =

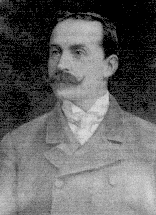
Pietro D'Ayala Valva Member of Parliament of the Kingdom of Italy: Legislation / XIV, XV, XVI, XVII, XVIII, XIX, XX; Parliamentary Group / Left; District / Taranto

Pietro D'Ayala, nobleman of the Marquises of Valva, nobleman of Taranto, count (Taranto, 2 April 1848 – Taranto, 9 March 1923), was an Italian nobleman and politician.

== Biography ==
Count Pietro was born on 2 April 1848 into the noble D'Ayala Valva family. This illustrious family itself is of very ancient origin and some believe it to have come from a descendant of Gaius Servilius Ahala, a famous figure in the history of ancient Rome, sent by that republic to Spain after the second Punic war, when the Romans conquered this nation. The small difference in the "h" changed to "y" is attributed to the custom of the nation or to the Gothic pronunciation. Others believe it to have descended from the ancient lords of Biscay. In all cases, most sources generalize the more recent origin to that of being from Spain, which would be true in either of these two cases. The family then moved to Naples. The book on Sicilian nobility by Francesco Palazzolo Drago describes the family's coat of arms as that depicting two wolves facing each other for Ayala and 8 female blackbirds for Valva.

Pietro was the leader of the Taranto Progressive Party. From 1882 he sat in the Chamber of Deputies uninterruptedly for seven legislatures. He was an opponent of Depretis, and a supporter of Francesco Crispi. On 25 November 1892, he was elected one of the Secretaries of the Chamber of Deputies. He was nominated senator on 14 June 1900 and was elected secretary in the Office of the Presidency during the XXIV legislature. He was part of the Commission of Inquiry into the conditions of farmers in Southern Italy.
